"My Heart's Symphony" is a 1966 song written by Glen Hardin and performed by Gary Lewis & the Playboys, and featured on their 1966 album, (You Don't Have To) Paint Me a Picture. The song was produced by Snuff Garrett and Leon Russell and arranged by Russell and Hardin.

Chart performance
In the US, "My Heart's Symphony" reached #13 on the Billboard Hot 100. Outside the US, it went to #31 in Canada, #36 in the United Kingdom, and #98 in Australia.

Other versions
The Midnight String Quartet released a version of the song on their 1966 album, Rhapsodies for Young Lovers.
The Four Lads released a version of the song in 1969 that reached #38 on the U.S. adult contemporary chart.

References 

1966 songs
1966 singles
1969 singles
Gary Lewis & the Playboys songs
The Four Lads songs
Song recordings produced by Snuff Garrett
Liberty Records singles
United Artists Records singles
Songs written by Glen Hardin